Year 140 (CXL) was a leap year starting on Thursday (link will display the full calendar) of the Julian calendar. At the time, it was known as the Year of the Consulship of Hadrianus and Caesar (or, less frequently, year 893 Ab urbe condita). The denomination 140 for this year has been used since the early medieval period, when the Anno Domini calendar era became the prevalent method in Europe for naming years.

Events 
 By place 

 Roman Empire 
 Emperor Antoninus Augustus Pius and Marcus Aurelius Caesar become Roman Consuls.
 Antoninus Pius recognizes the king of the Quadi, who becomes an ally of Rome.
 King Mithridates V dies; Vologases III claims the throne and extends his rule throughout the Parthian Empire.
 The export of olive oil from Hispania Baetica to Rome peaks.

 By topic 

 Religion 
 Pope Pius I succeeds Pope Hyginus as the tenth pope of Rome according to tradition.
 Marcion arrives in Rome, bringing Evangelikon and Apostolikon to the Christian community.

 Art and science 
 Ptolemy completes his Almagest (approximate date).

Births 
 Ballomar, leader of the Marcomanni (approximate date)
 Zhang Jiao, leader of the Yellow Turban Rebellion (d. 184)

Deaths 
 Faustina the Elder, Roman empress (b. 100 AD)
 Gaius Bruttius Praesens Lucius Fulvius Rusticus, Roman politician (b. AD 68)
 Menelaus of Alexandria, Greek mathematician (b. AD 70)
 Mithridates V, king of the Parthian Empire

References